The Tampico metropolitan area is the third most populous metropolitan area in the state of Tamaulipas, in the country of Mexico. Its in-state metropolitan area of Tamaulipas counts with the municipalities of Tampico, Ciudad Madero, Altamira. On the other hand, the out-of-state municipalities include Pueblo Viejo and Pánuco, from the state of Veracruz. 

The metropolitan area of Tampico currently has a population of approximately 864,584.

Populated Places
The metropolitan area of Tampico is formed by the following populated places:

In Tamaulipas
 Tampico: 309,003
 Ciudad Madero: 197,216 
 Altamira: 212,001

In Veracruz
 Pueblo Viejo: 55,358
 Pánuco: 91,006

See also
Laredo – Nuevo Laredo
Metropolitan areas of Mexico
Reynosa—McAllen Metropolitan Area
Matamoros—Brownsville Metropolitan Area

References 

Metropolitan areas of Mexico
Populated places in Tamaulipas
Tampico